MCDecaux, Inc. (エムシードゥコー株式会社 Emushīdukō Kabushiki Kaisha) is a Japanese advertising firm headquartered in the Nishimoto Kosan Nishikicho Building (西本興産錦町ビル Nishimoto Kōsan Nishikichō Biru) in Nishikichō, Chiyoda, Tokyo.

MCDecaux is a joint venture with JCDecaux and Mitsubishi Corp. JCDecaux owns 85% of the company, with the remaining 15% owned by Mitsubishi. In 2005 McDecaux got a 15-year contract with Ito Yokado.

References

External links

 McDecaux 

Service companies based in Tokyo
Mitsubishi companies